= Nigerian Village Square =

Nigerian website

The Nigerian Village Square is a website allowing the exchange of ideas and opinions of Nigeria by Nigerians in the country or in its diaspora. It was founded in 2003 by Nigerian immigrants in the United States.
